Kim McCloud (born May 8, 1968) is an American football coach and former defensive back who is currently a Defensive Analyst for the  University of Montana. He was previously the cornerbacks coach at Syracuse University and then interim cornerbacks coach at the University of Hawaii.

Playing career 
McCloud played college football at Hawaii from 1987 to 1990. During his time at Hawaii, he earned an honorable mention in All-WAC honors, as was also named a All-WAC academic selection in 1990. He signed with the San Diego Chargers in 1991 following the end of his college career, and also spent two seasons with the Saskatchewan Roughriders of the Canadian Football League (CFL).

Coaching career 
After his playing career concluded, McCloud worked at a bank, but spent time as the defensive coordinator at Kaiser High School in Hawaii, mostly as a favor to one of his former UH teammates. From there, his interest in coaching took off and he accepted a graduate assistant position at Missouri in 1997. He joined the coaching staff at Idaho in 1998 as their defensive backs coach. He was one of the assistants that Idaho head coach Chris Tormey brought over when Tormey accepted the head coaching position at Nevada in 2000. He was retained by Chris Ault after Tormey was fired in 2004, and was promptly reassigned to coaching wide receivers. He was then reassigned back to coaching cornerbacks the following season. He was named the secondary coach at Baylor in 2008. He was named the defensive backs coach at Akron in 2011.

McCloud joined the coaching staff at Eastern Illinois in 2012 as their defensive coordinator, working under Dino Babers, who he was an assistant with at Baylor from 2008 to 2010. He followed Babers to Bowling Green in 2014, once again as defensive coordinator before being asked to move to wide receivers in 2015.

McCloud was named the assistant head coach & receivers coach at Syracuse in 2016, joining Babers once again. He was reassigned to coaching cornerbacks in 2018. McCloud did not have his contract with Syracuse renewed after the 2019 season.

McCloud was named a defensive analyst and quality control coach at his alma mater Hawaii in 2020. He was elevated to interim cornerbacks coach on August 2, 2021.

References

External links 
 
 Hawaii Rainbow Warriors profile
 Syracuse Orange profile
 Bowling Green Falcons profile

1968 births
Living people
Coaches of American football from California
Players of American football from Los Angeles
American football defensive backs
American football wide receivers
Hawaii Rainbow Warriors football players
San Diego Chargers players
Saskatchewan Roughriders players
High school football coaches in Hawaii
Missouri Tigers football coaches
Idaho Vandals football coaches
Nevada Wolf Pack football coaches
Baylor Bears football coaches
Akron Zips football coaches
Eastern Illinois Panthers football coaches
Bowling Green Falcons football coaches
Syracuse Orange football coaches
Hawaii Rainbow Warriors football coaches
Sports coaches from Los Angeles
Players of Canadian football from Los Angeles